Books of authority is a term used by legal writers to refer to a number of early legal textbooks that are excepted from the rule that textbooks (and all books other than statute or law report) are not treated as authorities by the courts of England and Wales and other common law jurisdictions.

These books are treated by the courts as authoritative statements of the law as it was at the time at which they were written, on the authority of their authors alone. Consequently, they are treated as authoritative statements of the law as it is at the present time, unless it is shown that the law has changed, and may be cited and relied on in court as such.

The statements made in these books are presumed to be evidence of judicial decisions which are no longer extant. The primary reason for this practice is the difficulty associated with ascertaining the law of the medieval and early modern periods.

On the subject of this practice, William Blackstone said:

Abridgements of the year books

Fitzherbert
La Graunde Abridgement (1514) by Anthony Fitzherbert.

Brooke
La Graunde Abridgement (1568) by Robert Broke.

Statham
Epitome Annalium Librorum tempore Henrici Sexti (c.1495?) by Nicholas Statham.

Anonymous
The author of the Abridgement of the Book of Assizes (c.1510) is unknown. This book is sometimes called Liber Assisarum, after the Year Book from which some of its cases are abridged.

Treatises, commentaries and institutes

On the common law

Glanvill
Tractatus de Legibus et Consuetudinibus regni Angliae. (Treatise on the Laws and Customs of the Realm of England). (c.1189). Attributed to Ranulf de Glanvill; possibly the work of Hubert Walter.

Bracton
De Legibus et Consuetudinibus Angliae (On the Laws and Customs of England) (c.1250) by Henry de Bracton.

Britton
Summa de Legibus Anglie que Vocatur Bretone (Britton). (late 13th century).

Fleta
Fleta seu Commentarius Juris Anglicani (Fleta). (ca. 1290).

Hengham
Traditionally, Ralph de Hengham was believed to be a prolific author of common law procedural treatises, and numerous works were attributed to him.  These included not only the eponymous Hengham parva and Hengham magna, but also "Cum sit necessarium", "Exceptiones ad Cassandum Brevia", "Fet Asaver", "Judicium Essoniorum", and "Modus Componendi Brevia", among others.  More recent scholarly analysis, however, reveals that only the Parva (a set of lectures directed towards junior-level law students) is conclusively his.  Hengham may also have written two consultations.

Littleton
Treatise on Tenures (1481) by Thomas de Littleton.

Staunford
Plees del Coron (Pleas of the Crown) (1557) by William Staunford

Fitzherbert
La Novelle Natura Brevium (New Natura Brevium) (1534) by Anthony Fitzherbert.

Coke
Institutes of the Lawes of England (1628-1644) by Sir Edward Coke.

Hale
Historia Placitorum Coronæ (The History of the Pleas of the Crown) (1736) by Matthew Hale.

Hawkins
Treatise on Pleas of the Crown (1716) by William Hawkins.

Foster
Crown Law (1762) by Michael Foster.

Blackstone
Commentaries on the Laws of England (1765-1769) by William Blackstone.

On equity
Doctor and Student (1528) by Christopher St. Germain.

On canon law
Provinciale (1430) by William Lyndwood

On the law merchant
Lex Mercatoria (1622) by Gerard de Malynes

References
O. Hood Phillips, A First Book of English Law, Sweet and Maxwell, 4th ed., 1960, chapter 14, pp. 186 – 203

External links
Rutgers University, Books of authority

Law books
Legal terminology